Ronald or Ron Lewis may refer to:

Ronald G. Lewis (1941–2019), first Native American to receive a Ph.D. in the field of social work
Ronald Lewis (actor) (1928–1982), Welsh actor
Ronald Lewis (British politician) (1909–1990), British politician
Ronald Lewis (rugby league), rugby league footballer of the 1940s and 1950s
Ronald Lewis (baritone) (1916–1967), Welsh opera singer
Butch Lewis (Ronald Everett Lewis, 1946–2011), American boxing promoter and manager
Ron Lewis (basketball) (born 1984), basketball player for the Ohio State University
Ron Lewis (offensive lineman) (born 1972), American football offensive lineman in the NFL
Ron Lewis (wide receiver) (born 1968), American football wide receiver in the NFL
Ron Lewis (born 1946), U.S. Representative from Kentucky